John Doms (5 November 1924 in Waarloos – 27 June 2013 in Duffel) was a Belgian long-distance runner who competed in cross country running and the steeplechase. His greatest achievements came at the International Cross Country Championships (the precursor to the world championship). He became Belgium's first ever winner of the event in 1948, leading the Belgian men to the team title as well. He returned four times further, taking 12th in both 1949 and 1950, before sinking out of the top twenty at the two following year's races. He shared in the team silver medal in both 1950 and 1951. His Belgian team contemporaries included Marcel Vandewattyne and Lucien Theys.

He was born in Waarloos, Antwerp Province and died in Duffel. He represented Belgium at the 1948 Summer Olympics in London, running in the steeplechase, though he was eliminated in qualifying. He represented Belgium on the track at one further major competition – he placed ninth in the 10,000 metres at the 1950 European Athletics Championships.

International competitions

References

1924 births
2013 deaths
Sportspeople from Antwerp Province
Belgian male long-distance runners
Belgian male steeplechase runners
Olympic athletes of Belgium
Athletes (track and field) at the 1948 Summer Olympics
International Cross Country Championships winners
People from Kontich